Godič is a village on the left bank of the Kamnik Bistrica River in the Municipality of Kamnik in the Upper Carniola region of Slovenia.

Name
Godič was first attested in written sources in 1426 as Goditsch (and as Godicz in 1447). The name is derived from the plural form *Godiči, from the patronymic Godič based on a name such as *Godislavъ, *Godimirъ, etc. The name thus means 'place where Godič and his people live.' In the past the German name was Goditsch.

Cultural heritage
In 1993 the Archaeological Section of the National Museum of Slovenia excavated a Roman cave shrine in a local rock shelter known as Pod Gričo. A number of votive offerings, coins, potshards, and animal bones were found at the site.

Notable natives
Notable people that were born or lived in Godič include:
Jurij Jan (1821–1900), priest and cultural activist in San Dorligo della Valle
Štefan Kališnik (1929–2004), playwright
Francis Xavier Pierz (1785–1880), missionary

References

External links 
Godič on Geopedia

Populated places in the Municipality of Kamnik
Votive offering